The establishment of the annual budget of the Federal Republic of Germany is known as the German budget process.

Purpose 
The primary purpose of the budget is to create an overview of the country's revenues and expenses for the following fiscal year or years. Since the budget is based on past expenditures, it is merely a prediction of the future which can lead to unexpected budget deficits as the fiscal year progresses. In the short term, such deficits are commonly financed by borrowing money which has led to the significant long-term debt of the German federal government.

Procedure 
The Bundestag passes the budget as an addendum to the annual or bi-annual budget act (Art. 110, Basic Law). Revenues and expenses are separated by ministries and other administrative entities.

Budget guidelines 
Specific guidelines established by law govern the creation of the budget. Specifically, these are:
 Completeness: the budget must include all instances of revenues and expenditures separately.
 Clarity: the budget must be organized along ministry and functional lines.
 Unity: the budget must include all revenues and expenditures
 Accuracy: revenues and expenditures must be estimated based on actual fair market value or expected values. To avoid manipulations, such estimates are conducted by a separate official body.
 Historical Succession: the budget must be enacted before the fiscal year starts. If there is no budget for the current fiscal year, the previous budget continues in effect.
 Specificity: expenditures must be designated as falling into a specific area, at a specific time, and at a specific level.
 Publicity: all debates on the budget in the Bundestag as well as the final enacted budget are publicly available and accessible. Some expenditures, however, may be classified with appropriate restrictions on who can access information on those.

Example Budget 
The federal budget for 2021 is €369.3 billion

Germany's budget for the 2005 fiscal year can be found below, which also outlines the basic budget structure.

Notes

References 
Germany: Ministry of Finance's Task Force Recommends Introduction of Performance Budgeting and Accrual Accounting, Michel Lazare, IMF/FAD
Major Reforms for German Budget System, IMFSurvey Magazine: Countries & Regions, Marc Robinson, IMF/FAD

Germany
Government of Germany